Douglas Gordon Brown (born September 29, 1974) is a retired National Football League (NFL) and Canadian Football League (CFL) defensive tackle.  He played college football at Simon Fraser University.  Brown won the CFL's Most Outstanding Canadian Award in 2001. He played for the Winnipeg Blue Bombers from 2001 until his retirement in 2011, competing in three Grey Cups:  2001, 2007, and 2011.  He was a CFL All-Star eight times.

Career
Brown was drafted by the Calgary Stampeders 5th overall in the 1997 CFL draft. However, he did not play a game with them and signed with the Buffalo Bills of the NFL, spending his entire time there on the practice squad. Following that he went to play for the Washington Redskins where he played ten games with the NFL team.

The 2000 season was a wash, but the end of the season saw his rights traded to Winnipeg from Calgary. He started playing with the Bombers for the 2001 CFL season which saw him named as the CFL's Most Outstanding Canadian and a visit to the 2001 Grey Cup game which the Bombers ended up losing. He soon acquired the nickname "Big Bird" and again won as Winnipeg's MOC award again the following season.

Next season, in 2004, Brown won his third recognition as the Bombers' MOC and also won the award for the Most Outstanding Defensive Player. 2006 was another strong season, and arguably his strongest with the Blue Bombers. However, he finished as runner up for the Most Outstanding Canadian award that year. Brown went to the 2007 Grey Cup, his second appearance in the penultimate CFL, but again came up short losing by four points to the Saskatchewan Roughriders.

Brown won his fifth CFL All-Star recognition in 2008 and again finished as runner-up for the MODP award. 2009 saw a return to recognition for Brown where he again won Winnipeg's MOC and MODP awards. Despite being one of the oldest players in the CFL, Brown continued to excel during the 2010 season. He finished with his seventh CFL All-Star naming that year.

The 2011 CFL season saw Brown as a member of the self-titled "Swaggerville" defence for Winnipeg, which was one of the top defences in the league at that time. The 2011 season also saw Brown win his eighth East Division all-star nod.

In 2016, he was finally inducted into the Canadian Football Hall of Fame.

Statistics

Personal
Brown credited former Coquitlam Cheetahs track and field coach Percy Perry with developing his running which enabled his progression to pro football.

He currently writes a weekly sports column for the Winnipeg Free Press. Brown also serves as colour commentator for Blue Bomber broadcasts on CJOB 680 AM radio in Winnipeg.

Brown is also currently a KidSport Winnipeg Sport Ambassador, helping run an annual Football Camp for recipients of KidSport Winnipeg funding.

He resides in Winnipeg.

References

External links
NFL Stats
KidSport Winnipeg

1974 births
American football defensive tackles
Buffalo Bills players
Canadian expatriate American football people in the United States
Canadian football defensive linemen
Canadian Football Hall of Fame inductees
Canadian Football League Most Outstanding Canadian Award winners
Canadian players of American football
Living people
Players of Canadian football from British Columbia
Simon Fraser Clan football players
Sportspeople from New Westminster
Washington Redskins players
Winnipeg Blue Bombers players